Fragile – Handle with Care is a studio album by American Christian and country singer Cristy Lane. It was released in September 1981 via Liberty and LS Records and contained 11 tracks. It was the seventh studio album of Lane's music career and second to be issued on the Liberty label. Three singles were spawned from the project, including "Cheatin' Is Still on My Mind" and "Lies on Your Lips". Both songs made the top 40 on the American country chart.

Background and content
Cristy Lane first had commercial success in country music during the late 1970s with songs like "Let Me Down Easy" and "I Just Can't Stay Married to You". In 1980, she had the biggest hit single of her career with the Christian song One Day at a Time". The song became a number one hit. Before transitioning completely into the Christian market, she continued recording country-pop material for the next several years while at Liberty Records. 

Her next studio album, Fragile – Handle with Care was recorded in a similar country-pop style. It contained a total of 11 tracks. Included were covers of Hot's "Angel in Your Arms", Connie Smith's "Once a Day" and The Four Preps' "Love of the Common People". A re-recorded version of "One Day at a Time" is also featured. The project was recorded in June 1981 at the Woodland Studio, located in Nashville, Tennessee. The sessions were mostly produced by Ron Oates and Bob Jenkins, with executive production credits being given to Don Grierson and Lee Stoller (Lane's husband and manager).

Release and chart performance
Fragile – Handle with Care was released in September 1981 on Liberty Records and LS Records. It was Lane's second studio release with the label and the seventh of her recording career. The album was originally distributed as a vinyl LP and a cassette. The album was her fourth to reach the Billboard Top Country Albums chart, peaking at number 43 in 1981. Three singles were spawned that became charting singles. In August 1981, "Cheatin' Is Still on My Mind" was issued as the record's first single. The song became a top 40 hit after it reached number 38 on the Billboard Hot Country Songs chart. It was followed by "Lies on Your Lips", which was issued as a single in December 1981. The song peaked at number 22 on the Billboard country songs chart in 1981. The title track was issued as the project's final single in April 1982 and reached number 52 on the Billboard country chart.

Track listing

Personnel
All credits are adapted from the liner notes of Fragile – Handle with Care.

Musical personnel

 Eddie Bayers – Drums
 Jerry Carrigan – Drums
 Doug Clements – Background vocals
 Larry Byrom – Guitar
 Ray Edenton – Acoustic guitar
 Mary Fielder – Background vocals
 Jim Glaser – Background vocals
 Lloyd Green – Steel guitar
 Leo Jackson – Guitar
 Sheri Kramer – Background vocals
 The Shelly Kurland Strings – Strings
 Cristy Lane – Lead vocals
 Linda Lange – Background vocals 
 Patti Leatherwood – Background vocals
 Anne Marie – Background vocals
 Donna McElroy – Background vocals
 Farrell Morris – Percussion

 Roger Morris – Keyboards
 Ron Oates – Keyboards
 Jack Ross – Bass
 Steve Schaeffer – Bass
 Dale Sellers – Guitar
 Donna Sherridan – Background vocals 
 Muscle Shoals Horns – Horn
 Lisa Silver – Background vocals
 John Stacy – Drums
 James Stroud – Drums
 Bobby Taylor – Horn
 Diane Tidwell – Background vocals
 Pete Wade – Acoustic guitar
 Bergan White – Background vocals 
 Bob Wray – Bass
 Reggie Young – Acoustic guitar

Technical personnel
 Bob Jenkins – Producer
 Don Grierson – Executive producer
 Steve Ham – Engineering
 Les Ladid – Engineering
 Mike Leech – Arrangement
 Ron Oates – Producer, arrangement
 Lee Stoller – Executive producer, manager

Charts

Release history

References

1981 albums
Cristy Lane albums
Liberty Records albums
LS Records albums